Božidar Urošević (born 9 February 1975) is a Serbian retired football goalkeeper.  After finishing his career, he became goalkeeping coach.

Career
He started his career playing in the youth squads of his home town FK Priština. In 1992, he passed to the senior squad, playing, in that period, in the First League of FR Yugoslavia. In 1995, he moved to the historic, also First league, club Radnički Niš. He still played one season in the lower league FK Palilulac, before moving, in 1997, to Belgium to play in SV Roeselare for two seasons. In 1999, he moved to Germany to play in the 2. Bundesliga club Rot-Weiß Oberhausen, but after one season, was back to Belgium, now to play in RC Harelbeke, a club that changed name to K.R.C. Zuid-West-Vlaanderen. In 2002, he was back to Serbia, this time to the ambitious Second League club Hajduk Beograd before, in 2003, moving to the, traditionally biggest, Bosnia and Herzegovina club FK Željezničar from Sarajevo. After one season there, he was back to Serbia, now to plat in the First League club Borac Čačak, but soon, moved to a short spell in Cyprus with AEP Paphos. After returning, he played for one and a half seasons in, now called Serbian SuperLiga club FK Smederevo. In January 2007, he moved back to a Serbian First League, new name for the old Second League, club Hajduk Beograd, where he stayed until 2008. Then he moved to Premier League of Bosnia and Herzegovina, Bosnian-Serb club FK Laktaši. In 2009, with 34 years, decided to return to Serbia, and signed with FK Sloga Kraljevo.

After finishing his playing career, he became goalkeeping coach.  After working in FK Rad, he moved to another Serbian SuperLiga side, FK Voždovac during the winter break of the 2014–15 season.

Personal life
Next to his football success, he also got a bachelor's degree in "Physical preparation of football players" which he was finished in 2002 at the University of Priština. He is married to Marijana Urosevic, and a father of son Stefan, and  two daughters Tara and Violeta and lives in Belgrade.

References

External links
 Playing career in BozidarUrosevic.com
 Profile and stats at Srbijafudbal

Living people
1975 births
Sportspeople from Pristina
Serbian footballers
Serbian expatriate footballers
FC Prishtina players
FK Radnički Niš players
Challenger Pro League players
K.S.V. Roeselare players
Expatriate footballers in Belgium
Rot-Weiß Oberhausen players
Expatriate footballers in Germany
R.W.D.M. Brussels F.C. players
FK Željezničar Sarajevo players
FK Borac Čačak players
Cypriot First Division players
AEP Paphos FC players
Expatriate footballers in Cyprus
FK Smederevo players
FK Laktaši players
FK Sloga Kraljevo players
Association football goalkeepers
K.R.C. Zuid-West-Vlaanderen players